686 may refer to:

 686, year 686 AD
 686 BC
 686 (number)
 686 Gersuind, a minor planet orbiting the Sun
 6-8-6, a wheel arrangement of steam locomotives
 +686, the country calling code for telephone numbers in Kiribati
 Gliese 686, a star in the constellation of Hercules
 Hawaii SB 686, a bill pertaining to cannabis legalization (2019)
 i686, the P6 (sixth-generation) Intel x86 microarchitecture, implemented in the Pentium Pro microprocessor (1995)
 K686, pennant number of Royal Canadian Navy ship HMCS Fergus (1944–1945)
 Kosmos 686, a Soviet satellite launched in 1974
 Minuscule 686, a Greek minuscule manuscript of the New Testament
 Scandinavian Airlines Flight 686, an airplane involved in the Linate Airport disaster (2001)
 Smith & Wesson Model 686, a revolver
 United Nations Security Council Resolution 686, adopted in March 1991 pertaining to Iraq
 USS Eugene E. Elmore (DE-686), a destroyer escort of the United States Navy (1944–1946)
 USS Halsey Powell (DD-686), a destroyer of the United States Navy (1943–1968)
 USS L. Mendel Rivers (SSN-686), an attack submarine of the United States Navy (1975–2001)
 USS Vester (SP-686), a patrol vessel and minesweeper of the United States Navy (1917–1919)
 VLY-686, an experimental drug known as tradipitant

See also
 List of highways numbered 686